HTML parsers are software for automated Hypertext Markup Language (HTML) parsing. They have two main purposes: 
 HTML traversal: offer an interface for programmers to easily access and modify the "HTML string code".  Canonical example: DOM parsers.
 HTML clean:  to fix invalid HTML and to improve the layout and indent style of the resulting markup. Canonical example: HTML Tidy.

 * Latest release (of significant changes) date.
 ** sanitize (generating standard-compatible web-page, reduce spam, etc.) and clean (strip out surplus presentational tags,  remove XSS code, etc.) HTML code.
 *** Updates HTML4.X to XHTML or to HTML5, converting deprecated tags (ex. CENTER) to valid ones (ex. DIV with style="text-align:center;").

References

HTML parsers
HTML parsers